Atto may refer to:

People

Given name 
 Atto Melani (born 1626–1714), Italian opera singer
 Atto Mensah (born 1964), Sierra Leonean football player and coach
 Adalbert Atto of Canossa (died 988), Count of Canossa
 Atto (archbishop of Milan) (11th century)
 Atto (bishop of Vic) (died 971)
 Atto of Pistoia (1070–1153), Italian prelate
 Atto of Spoleto (7th century), Duke of Spoleto
 Atto of Vercelli (885–961), bishop of Vercelli
 Atto Tigri (born 1813–1875), Italian anatomist

Surname 
 Osman Ali Atto (1940–2013), Somali warlord

Other uses 
 Amazon Tall Tower Observatory, a scientific research facility in the Amazon rainforest of Brazil
 atto-, the metric prefix denoting a factor of 10
 ATTO Technology, a computer electronics manufacturer
 Atto I, 1975 album by Al Bano and Romina Power

See also 

 Antto (disambiguation)